The Battle of Phagwara was a battle fought between the Akal Sena forces led by Guru Hargobind and the Mughal forces led by Ahmad Khan.

Background
After the Battle of Kartarpur, Guru Hargobind along with some devotees left the plains and set out for the hills. Guru Hargobind knew that it was difficult withstanding the Mughals and a safer place to settle would be Kiratpur Sahib. The Guru had already suffered high amount of losses in men and material.

Battle
When the Guru and his troops were passing through Phagwara, they were attacked by a contingent of royal Mughal forces under the command of Ahmad Khan, the grandson of Abdulla Khan who died against the Sikhs in the Battle of Rohilla. However, the Mughal forces failed to cause much damage to the Sikhs. Ahmad Khan and Fateh Khan were killed by the Sikh forces while Zafat Khan and Jamal Khan fought till the end. As for the Sikhs, Bhai Desa and Bhai Sohela fell martyrs.

Aftermath
This battle was the last major battle between the Sikhs and the Mughals. Guru Hargobind finally reached Kiratpur and abandoned the idea to encounter the Mughal forces.

See also 
 Nihang
 Martyrdom and Sikhism

References

Battles involving the Sikhs
History of India